Alexandre Artus (27 November 1821 – 19 August 1911) was a 19th-century French conductor and composer.

Biography
Alexandre Artus was born in Perpignan, the son of Joseph Pierre Artus (1791–1864) and Marie Angélique Salvo (1793–1864), both also from Perpignan. His father played the viola, and he was the younger brother of Amédée Artus, also a composer and conductor.

Incidental music and operettas coçmposer, he was the deputy chief and the conductor of the Théâtre de l'Ambigu, which he left in 1863 by disagreements with the director and then became director of the Théâtre du Châtelet from 1885 to his death. He is known to have composed the music for the play by Jules Verne, Michel Strogoff (1881), adapted from the novel.

Alexandre Artus is buried at Père Lachaise Cemetery.

Works 

1851: L’Étoile du berger Chasse, arranged in doubled step for fanfare
1857: Les Chevaliers du brouillard, quadrille Anglo-français, with Amédée Artus
1857: Les Viveurs de Paris
 Chanson
 Polka pour piano
 Quadrille pour piano
1858: Faust, spectacle, choreography by Léon Espinosa
1858: Fanfan-la-Tulipe, quadrille for piano
1858: Les Fugitifs, quadrille for piano
1858: Le Martyre du cœur
1859: Fanfan-la-Tulipe, polka for piano
1859: Le Maitre d'école, quadrille for piano
1859: Polka du roi de carreau, for piano
1859: La Voie sacrée, ou les Étapes de la gloire, military drama in five acts and 12 tableaux, by Eugène Woestyn, Ernest Bourget and Hector Crémieux
1860: Le Pied de mouton, show
1860: La Dame de Monsoreau, drama by Alexandre Dumas and Auguste Maquet
 Marche de la procession pour fanfare
 Polka mazurka
 Quadrille
1860: Le Marchand de coco, polka for piano
1860: La Sirène de Paris, ronde chantée in the drama by Eugène Grangé and Xavier de Montépin
1861: Le Monstre et le Magicien, couplets of the Gitanos, lyrics by Ferdinand Dugué and quadrille for piano
1861: Violette, polka mazurka for piano
1862: Les Beaux Messieurs de Bois-Doré, quadrille for piano
1862: La Bouquetière des Innocents, quadrille for piano
1862: Cadet-Roussel, quadrille for piano
1862: Les Hirondelles, ou pi pi pi pi pi pi ouit
1862: Louise, polka
1862: Les Mystères du Temple, polka for piano and quadrille
1863: François Les-bas-bleus, quadrille for piano
1863: Les Hirondelles de Paris, Zoude, lyrics by Eugène Moreau and Jules Dornay
1863: La Poissarde !, quadrille for piano
1863: Le Retour du soldat, cantata by Mélanie Waldor
1865: Rocambole (de l'Ambigu), quadrille
1865: La Voleuse d'enfants, ronde des chauves-souris
1866: Cric-crac tintamarre, ronde chantée in Rocambole, lyrics by Auguste Anicet-Bourgeois
1874: Les Bibelots du diable, valse des sultanes, piano
1875: Les Muscadins, quadrille, piano or orchestra
1875: Les Rendez-vous de chasses, pas redoublé
1876: C'est du toc et de l'occase, ronde parisienne, lyrics by L. Gothi and V. Courtès
1877: Champagne ! En avant !, piano or orchestra, quadrille performed in Le régiment de Champagne
1877: Chanson du régiment de Champagne, lyrics by Jules Claretie
1877: Les Scaphandres, fantaisie
1877: La Marmite, chanson du timonier, sung in the hundredth  of Hamlet, lyrics by Théodore Barrière
1877: Thérésa, polka, motifs sur la pièce des Sept châteaux du diable
1878: Rothomago-fanfare, piano or orchestra
1878: Fantaisie sur des motifs du drame « Au fond de la mer »
1878: Miranda, waltz
1879: Marche de la caravane de la vénus noire, show, piano
1879: Léo, walz for piano performed in Les Pirates de la savane
1879: Rondes enfantines, fantaisie sur des motifs populaires, for piano
1879: Rondes et refrains populaires, ouverture pot-pourri
1881: Michael Strogoff by Jules Verne
 Retraite russe et Marche de cavalerie, piano or orchestra
 Marche triomphale, piano or orchestra
 Quadrille, piano or orchestra
 Marche des trompettes
 Sonneries et batteries d'ordonnance, followed by 12 pas redoublés nouveaux, for bugles and drums
1882: Les Mille et Une Nuits by Adolphe d'Ennery and Paul Ferrier
 Alchimiste-polka, piano or orchestra
 Quadrille, piano or orchestra
 Dinarzade, piano or orchestra
 Shéérazade, piano or orchestra
 Fanfare pour 4 trompettes
1882: Quadrille américain, piano or orchestra
1883: Madame Thérèse, marche des trompettes, piano
1883: Le Bataillon de la Sarre, pas redoublé, arranged by Victor Gentil fils, for wind orchestra
1883: Éden Théâtre, pas redoublé pour musique militaire ou fanfare
1883: Marche de Cléopâtre, arrangée pour musique militaire ou fanfare
1886: De Crac-polka, piano or orchestra, dance
1886: Marche indienne du Rajah, piano or orchestra
1886: Valse des bayadères, piano or orchestra
1887: Valse des bergers, piano or orchestra
1887: Les Beaux Messieurs de Bois-doré, show
1891: Tout-Paris, piano or orchestra
1891: Hymne russe, military music or fanfare
undated: Conseil à nos amis, lyrics by Libert, set to music with accompaniment of guitar or Lyre
undated Souvenir de Biarritz, quadrille

Bibliography 
 J. Goizet, A. Burtal, Dictionnaire universel du théâtre en France, vol. 2, 1867, p. 86 
 Jann Pasler, La République, la musique et le citoyen (1871–1914), 2015 (Read online)

References

External links 
 Alexandre Artus on data.bnf.fr

1821 births
1911 deaths
Burials at Père Lachaise Cemetery
French conductors (music)
French male classical composers
French male conductors (music)
French operetta composers
People from Perpignan